The 1971 Mississippi gubernatorial election took place on 2 November 1971 for the post of Governor of Mississippi. The incumbent governor, Democrat John Bell Williams, was ineligible due to term limits, a rule that was changed to two back-to-back terms in the 1980s.

Democrat Bill Waller, the former District Attorney of Hinds County, was chosen as his party's nominee in a contested primary. Running as an independent, Mayor of Fayette Charles Evers became the first African-American candidate for Governor of Mississippi.

Democratic primary

Democratic primary runoff

Republican primary
No Republican primary was held.

General election
Evers' campaign was supported by civil rights leader Coretta Scott King, the Congressional Black Caucus, and Mayor of New York John Lindsay. 

According to The New York Times, Waller ran a relatively moderate campaign. However, one report noted that Waller's campaign featured "racially ragged edges", such as airing radio commercials that played the song "Dixie" and receiving support from segregationist politicians like James Eastland.

Following Waller's victory, Evers drove across town to a local TV station to congratulate him. A reporter later wrote thatWaller's aides learned Evers was in the building and tried to hustle the governor-elect out of the studio as soon as the interview ended. They were not quite quick enough. Surrounded by photographers, reporters, and television crews, Evers approached Waller's car just as it was about to pull out. Waller and his wife were in the back seat. "I just wanted to congratulate you," said Evers. "Whaddya say, Charlie?" boomed Waller. His wife leaned across with a stiff smile and shook the loser's hand. During the campaign Evers told reporters that his main purpose in running was to encourage registration of black voters.

Results

References 

Gubernatorial
1971
Mississippi
Mississippi gubernatorial election